Viktoriya Mikhnovich (born 5 March 1997) is a Belarusian female acrobatic gymnast. With partner Marharyta Bartashevich, Mikhnovich achieved 4th in the 2014 Acrobatic Gymnastics World Championships. The pair were initially awarded bronze, but after the competition was complete the judges revised the score to reflect the fact that they had not finished in time with their music.

References

External links

 

1997 births
Living people
Belarusian acrobatic gymnasts
Female acrobatic gymnasts